Providence Little Company of Mary Medical Center is a hospital in Torrance, California, United States. The hospital was founded by the Sisters of the Little Company of Mary, and is part of the Providence Health & Services system.

See also
Little Company of Mary Hospital (San Pedro)

References

External links 
Little Company of Mary Hospital Official Website
This hospital in the CA Healthcare Atlas A project by OSHPD
Malpractice Case
Malpractice Case

Hospitals in Los Angeles County, California
Providence Health & Services
Buildings and structures in Torrance, California
Hospitals established in 1960
1960 establishments in California